Sphaerantia is a group of flowering plants in the family Myrtaceae, described as a genus in 1988. The entire genus is endemic to the northern part of the State of Queensland in Australia.

Species
 Sphaerantia chartacea Peter G.Wilson & B.Hyland
 Sphaerantia discolor Peter G.Wilson & B.Hyland

References

Myrtaceae
Rosids of Australia
Myrtaceae genera
Myrtales of Australia
Taxa named by Bernard Hyland
Endemic flora of Queensland